Suonenjoki (literally means "vein's river") is a town and municipality of Finland.

The town has a population of 
which 
is water. The population density is
.

The municipality is unilingually Finnish.

History
Suonenjoki is thought to have served as a milestone in the Treaty of Nöteborg in 1323. In the 16th and 17th centuries, more and more people began to change in the area, and in the 18th century, a preacher room was established in Suonenjoki, then a chapel. In the current agglomeration, bridges over the river of Suonenjoki were built early, Kruunusilta (literally means "Crowns Bridge") already existed in 1780, and Siioninsilta (means "Zion Bridge") at the beginning of the river was replaced by a bridge in the 1830s.

When Suonenjoki gained municipal rights in 1865, the population was about 4,000. In the same year, Suonenjoki Church, the current church in Suonenjoki was completed, replacing the cramped first church built in the late 18th century. A railway station was built on Suonenjoki in connection with the completion of The Savonian Railway (also known as Kouvola–Iisalmi railway) in 1889. In the early 20th century, the sawmill industry became the most important industry in the area. Strawberry cultivation became more widespread from the 1940s, and Suonenjoki became known as "the Strawberry Town". The Suonenjoki co-educational school began operations in 1930, and it moved to the current high school building in 1950.

Geography
The neighbouring municipalities of Suonenjoki are Rautalampi to the west, Tervo to the northwest, Kuopio to the north, Leppävirta to the east, and Pieksämäki to the south on the Southern Savonia side. Suonenjoki River flows through the town from Lake Suontee to Lake Iisvesi. Near the city center is the 10-kilometer-long and at most a couple of kilometers wide scenic Lintharju, which is also part of the European Union's Natura 2000 conservation program.

Villages

 Herrala
 Hulkkola
 Jauhomäki
 Karkkola
 Kukkola
 Kutumäki
 Kutunkylä
 Kuvansi
 Käpylä
 Kärkkäälä
 Lempyy
 Liedemäki
 Luukkola
 Lyytilänmäki
 Markkala
 Nuutila
 Piispalanmäki
 Pörölänmäki
 Rajalanniemi
 Rieponlahti
 Sydänmaa
 Toholahti
 Tyyrinmäki
 Vauhkola
 Vehvilä
 Viippero
 Jalkala
 Karsikonmäki
 Suontee
 Suihkola
 Kolikkoinmäki
 Kinnula

Culture

Suonenjoki is famous for its strawberries giving the town its coat of arms, three strawberry leaves. It is also known as "the Strawberry Town". Many foreigners, mainly from Ukraine and Russia, come to Suonenjoki in summer to work on strawberry farms. That makes Suonenjoki the most international town of Finland at summer. There is a party in Suonenjoki in July called Mansikkakarnevaalit, "". There was also a rock festival named Jörisrock, the last "Jöris" was held in 2006. Nowadays, "Jöris" has been replaced by a music event called Iisrock.

There is also three museums, library and artshow.

Newspaper Sisä-Savo is published in Suonenjoki and nearby municipalities.

Transportation
Suonenjoki is situated between two important cities, Kuopio and Jyväskylä, and the main road 9 (E63) between those cities goes through Suonenjoki. The railway between Kuopio and Helsinki goes also through the center of Suonenjoki.

Notable people
 Veijo Baltzar, author and visual artist
 Aatu Hämäläinen, ice hockey player
 Kalle Jalkanen, cross-country skier
 Erkki Junkkarinen, singer
 Lauri Kerminen, volleyball player
 Rakel Liekki, freelance journalist and former pornstar
 Rauno Miettinen, Nordic combined skier
 Iiro Pakarinen, ice hockey player in NHL
 Markku Rossi, politician
 Liisa Suihkonen, cross-country skier
 Kari Tapio, country & western and schlager singer

See also
 Finnish national road 69
 Suonenjoki rail collision

References

External links

Town of Suonenjoki – Official website 
Suonenjoen kesäkartta – A summer map of Suonenjoki from the town site 

 
Populated places established in 1865
Cities and towns in Finland